Robert Ellis Silberstein (also known as Bob Ellis; born January 5, 1946) is an American music executive and businessman. During his career, he managed many musicians, including Billy Preston, Diana Ross, Rufus, the Rolling Stones' Ronnie Wood, Meat Loaf and Status Quo.

Personal life 
Silberstein was born into a wealthy family of Jewish garment manufacturers in Elberon, New Jersey. He graduated from West Virginia University and tried teaching.

Silberstein was married to Diana Ross from 1971 to 1977. They have two daughters together Tracee Ellis Ross, and Chudney Ross.
Diana Ross has one daughter from a previous relationship: Rhonda Ross Kendrick,  Rhonda, whose biological father is Motown founder Berry Gordy, was born a few months after the marriage began, and Silberstein knowingly adopted her as his own.
Silberstein’s family came from a Jewish background. Upon graduating from West Virginia University, he took up teaching at the same school but had to quit the job because of some issues with the principal there. He then entered the music industry.

Professional career 
In the 1970s, he managed Diana Ross; the Rolling Stones' Ronnie Wood; Billy Preston; and Chaka Khan, whom he discovered while managing Rufus.

References

1943 births
Living people
20th-century American Jews
American music industry executives
Businesspeople from New York City
Silberstein family
21st-century American Jews